Jasper Washington (September 13, 1896 – February 16, 1960) was an American Negro league first baseman in the 1920s and 1930s.

A native of Dunbar, Pennsylvania, Washington made his Negro leagues debut in 1921 with the Homestead Grays. He played 11 seasons with the Grays, and also spent time with the Pittsburgh Keystones, Pittsburgh Crawfords, and Newark Browns. Washington died in Pittsburgh, Pennsylvania in 1960 at age 63.

References

External links
 and Baseball-Reference Black Baseball stats and Seamheads

1896 births
1960 deaths
Homestead Grays players
Newark Browns players
Pittsburgh Crawfords players
Pittsburgh Keystones players
Baseball first basemen
Baseball players from Pennsylvania
People from Fayette County, Pennsylvania
20th-century African-American sportspeople